Bill Grainer is a Grammy certified American songwriter and record producer. He has written for such artists as Jai McDowall, Linda Eder, and Jennifer Hudson, with whom he co-wrote the song "Stand Up" for her Grammy Award-winning self-titled debut album.

Selected songwriting discography

Television and film
Grainer wrote both the opening and closing title songs (including “Don’t Blink” on which he was also the performing artist) for the cult horror film Flight of the Living Dead: Outbreak on a Plane.

His song “Curiosity” (performed by Tatiana Owens) was used as the theme of Lifetime Movie Network in 2011.

Awards and nominations
Grammy Awards
2009 Grammy Award for Best R&B Album (Jennifer Hudson) (Winner)

Anugerah ERA (ERA Awards) (Malaysia)
2007: Best Pop Song (Shayna Zaid - "A Better Life") (Nominee)

Current and upcoming projects
Grainer is currently working with Australian actor and singer-songwriter Sam Clark, Harry Mondryk (formerly of UK boy band ReConnected), American Idol’s Kimberley Locke, and UK band Nothing But Thieves.

References

Year of birth missing (living people)
Living people
Singer-songwriters from New Jersey
Singer-songwriters from New York (state)
Record producers from New Jersey
Record producers from New York (state)
People from Marlboro Township, New Jersey
American male singer-songwriters
American lyricists